Kungsbacka (old ) is a locality and the seat of Kungsbacka Municipality in Halland County, Sweden, with 19,057 inhabitants in 2010.

It is one of the most affluent parts of Sweden, in part due to its simultaneous proximity to the countryside and the large city of Gothenburg. Its mayor since 2020 is Lisa Andersson.

History

The first records referring to Kungsbacka as a town date from the 15th century, when it was part of Denmark. By the time it was recognised as part of Sweden (1658), the river running through the town, on which some transportation of goods took place, was almost completely overgrown and despite pleas to restore its function, this did not occur. Some trade still took place from the coast, but the town's significance as a place of naval commerce lessened over the centuries. Today, it is the home of over 2,000 enterprises, and the river is still running through it.

A devastating fire in 1846 destroyed the town centre, sparing only a little red wooden cabin which is still standing today. In late 2006 and early 2014 other fires affected the town centre, and construction works are currently ongoing to restore the loss of wooden buildings.

The town remained small until the 1960s. The municipal reform of 1971 made it the seat of the much larger Kungsbacka Municipality. The town began to grow as a part of Metropolitan Gothenburg. It is the southern terminus of the Gothenburg commuter rail system, situated 28 km from central Gothenburg.

Sister cities
The following cities are twinned with Kungsbacka:
  Saarijärvi, Central Finland, Finland
  Neiva, Huila, Colombia

Notable people
Bengt Andersson, football player
Jonny Andersson, International motorcycle trials rider
Torsten Billman 1909-1989. Artist, woodcut engraver and mural painter
Lasse Brandeby, comic actor
Christian Folin (born 1991), ice hockey player for the Philadelphia Flyers
Lars Gathenhielm, 1689-1718. Pirate
Calle Johansson, ice hockey player
Fredrik Jacobson, golfer
Hasse Jeppson 1925-2013. Football player. Sweden squad - 1950 FIFA World Cup, Third Place
Niklas Rubin, ice hockey goaltender
Omar Rudberg,  Singer in FO&O
Ulrik Munther, Singer
Fridolina Rolfö, football player
Alexander Jeremejeff, professional footballer for Malmö FF
Sam Nilsson Ezeh, YouTuber

Sports
The following sports clubs are located in Kungsbacka:

 Varla IBK Floorball
 Kungsbacka IF
 Tölö IF
 HK Aranäs
 Kungsbacka Broncos Rugby league Club

References

External links 

 Kungsbacka Municipality - Official site

Municipal seats of Halland County
Coastal cities and towns in Sweden
Swedish municipal seats
Populated places in Halland County
Populated places in Kungsbacka Municipality
Metropolitan Gothenburg

fi:Kungsbackan kunta